Pavlo Andriyovych Kukhta (born 3 December 1985) is a Ukrainian economist and politician. On 4 March 2020, he was appointed as the Acting Minister of Economic Development, Trade and Agriculture.

Biography 
He graduated from Kyiv Polytechnic Institute. In 2018, he studied at Aspen Institute Kyiv.

Kukhta is an economist at the Center for Economic Solutions. He cooperated with the Reanimation Package of Reforms.

From 2015 to 2019, he worked as an adviser to the Minister of Finance.

From 2016 to 2019, he was an adviser to the Prime Minister of Ukraine.

In the July 2019 Ukrainian parliamentary election Kukhta failed as a candidate of Voice to get elected to parliament. His 25th place on the national election list was 8 places behind the elected members of the party.

From September 2019 to April 2020, Kukhta served as First Deputy Minister of Economic Development, Trade and Agriculture.

On March 26, 2022, Pavlo Kukhta went to the front line of the Russian-Ukrainian war, and around April 20, 2022, he resigned from the army.

See also 
 Shmyhal Government

References

External links 
 

1985 births
Living people
21st-century Ukrainian economists
21st-century Ukrainian politicians
Politicians from Kyiv
Kyiv Polytechnic Institute alumni
Ministry of Economic Development, Trade and Agriculture
Agriculture ministers of Ukraine
Voice (Ukrainian political party) politicians
Government advisors